Housing, or more generally, living spaces, refers to the construction and assigned usage of houses or buildings individually or collectively, for the purpose of shelter. Housing ensures that members of society have a place to live, whether it is a home or some other kind of dwelling, lodging or shelter. Many governments have one or more housing authorities, sometimes also called a housing ministry or housing department.

Housing in many different areas consists of public, social and private housing. In the United States, it was not until the 19th and 20th century that there was a lot more government involvement in housing. It was mainly aimed at helping those who were poor in the community. Public housing provides help and assistance to those who are poor and mainly low-income earners. A study report shows that there are many individuals living in public housing. There are over 1.2 million families or households. These types of housing were built mainly to provide people, mainly those who are low-income and elderly, with safe, affordable, and good housing units. There are many people who are a part of the United States Department of Housing and Urban Development (HUD). When counting, there are over nine hundred thousand participants in this program.

History 

With regards to the history of housing, there are studies that prove that the involvement of the government began in 1937, and it was "under the United States Housing Act". The goal was to improve many things such as all of the unsafe, unsanitary, and terrible housing conditions which connect to the issue of affordable housing. In 1940, there was development, and there was an Office of Housing expenditures. Later on, in the years, another housing act took place in 1956, and in 1960, there was recognition of rights which was considered to be a "huge turning point for public housing". Many of the policies created back then tend to be still active nowadays. If anybody needs housing follow some easy steps and get the housing whenever you want at any location or any price student accommodation london.

From that time until now, public housing has been increasing. In the 1980s, there were many public housing individuals and tenants who lived in many different areas, particularly those areas that were segregated. Some years later, a new program was created, and it caused many people to be relocated. This is similar to what we have today, where people are repositioned. Back then, the program was called Hope VI.

Moving forward to the 2000s, the problem of finding affordable housing started to increase, leading HUD to start taking action and helping out many homeowners, individuals, agencies, and communities in order to find affordable housing. Throughout the years after there had been an increase in housing prices then they tend to go down after a year, this was occurring in 2005, and it sure is occurring today, nowadays there are such high prices on houses. In 2008, an act did take place called the "Housing and Economic Recovery Act of 2008" and this act "strengthened and modernized the regulation of...(government-sponsored enterprises) and the Federal Home Loan Banks"  From 2013 to 2017, there were contributions occurring; for example, there was the LIHTC which although a source on the outside, did help out with HUD and provide many different funds which helped out with public housing, especially with their capital needs. From 2000 until 2019, inflation dropped because of all of the public housing funds. Nowadays affordable housing is a huge problem for so many families, and this is up by about ten to fifteen percent since 2018 because of the increase in prices.

Macroeconomy and housing price 
Previous research has shown that housing price is affected by the macroeconomy. Research from 2018 indicates that a 1% increase in the Consumer Price Index leads to a $3,559,715 increase in housing prices and raises the property price per square foot by $119.3387. Money Supply (M2) has a positive relationship with housing prices. As M2 increased by one unit, housing prices rose by 0.0618 in a study conducted in Hong Kong. When there is a 1% increase in the best lending rate, housing prices drop by between $18,237.26 and $28,681.17 in the HAC model. Mortgage repayments lead to a rise in the discount window base rate. A 1% rise in the rate leads to a $14,314.69 drop in housing prices, and an average selling price drop of $585,335.50. As the US real interest rate increases, the interest rates in Hong Kong must follow, increasing mortgage repayments. When there is a 1% increase in the US real interest rate, the property prices decrease from $9302.845 to $4957.274, and saleable area drops by $4.955206 and $14.01284. When there is a 1% rise in overnight Hong Kong Interbank Offered Rate, the housing prices drop to about 3455.529, and the price per ft2 will drop by $187.3119.

Effect on health
Housing is recognized as a social determinant of health. Lack of housing or poor-quality housing can negatively affect an individual's physical and mental health. Housing attributes that negatively affect physical health include dampness, mold, inadequate heating, and overcrowding. Mental health is also affected by inadequate heating, overcrowding, dampness, and mold, as well as lack of personal space. Instability in housing can negatively affect mental health. Housing can affect the health of children through exposure to asthma triggers or lead, and through injuries due to structural deficiencies (e.g. lack of window guards or radiator covers).

In addition to the negative effects that affordable housing has on health, there are many other negative effects that come with it. For example, the lack of affordable housing can lead many people to not be able to find housing which causes them to become homeless. Within the issue of people not being able to find affordable housing, there are two groups of individuals in the community;  those who are able to afford it and have the choice to do so and those who are not able to afford it. Those who are unable to afford it are more likely to become homeless but a large number of people will be out of this issue of homelessness if there was more affordable housing available. In California, in the HUD's report, it has proven that “California had about 134,000 homeless individuals, which represented about 24 percent of the total homeless population in the nation”. This is such a high number of people who are homeless without housing. It is a terrible thing for people to go through the process of being homeless, it has some serious mental illnesses. Many homeless people tend to get addicted to drugs, many become alcoholics, and many go through trauma and have mental illnesses. Homelessness is proven to increase because of the issue of affordable housing.

See also 

 Affordable housing
 :Category:Housing ministries
 Housing association; there are many articles on specific named housing associations
 Housing estate
 Housing in the United Kingdom
 Housing in Japan
 Informal housing
 Informal sector
 List of housing statutes
 List of human habitation forms
 Right to housing
 Subsidized housing
 US Federal Housing Administration

References

External links 

 
  house for sale in toronot